Mongkun is a village in Homalin Township, Hkamti District, in the Sagaing Region of northwestern Burma. It is located 1.7 kilometres west of Tawngbohla, and has an average elevation of 138 metres.

References

External links
Maplandia World Gazetteer

Populated places in Hkamti District
Homalin Township